Viola is an unincorporated community in Latah County, Idaho, United States.  Viola has a post office with a ZIP code of 83872.  Viola lies on U.S. Route 95 south of its intersection with Idaho State Highway 66 and north of Moscow.

Notable people
 Dan Foreman, state senator

References

Unincorporated communities in Latah County, Idaho
Unincorporated communities in Idaho